Aniceto Arce (or short: Arce) is a province in the southern parts of the Bolivian department Tarija. The province is named after Aniceto Arce Ruiz (1824-1906), President of Bolivia from 1888 until 1892.

Location

Aniceto Arce province is one of six provinces in the Tarija Department. It is located between 21° 45' and 22° 53' south and between 64° 06' and 65° 02' west.

The province borders Cercado Province and José María Avilés Province in the north, the Republic of Argentina in the west and south-east, Gran Chaco Province in the east, and Burnet O'Connor Province in the north-east.

The province extends over 140 km from north to south, and 100 km from east to west.

Population
Main idiom of the province is Spanish, spoken by 80.7%, and 0.2% Guaraní.

The population increased from 44,713 inhabitants (1992 census) to 52,570 (2001 census), an increase of 17.6%. - 42.9% of the population are younger than 15 years old.

 55.4% of the population have no access to electricity, 51.4% have no sanitary facilities.

 42.1% of the population are employed in agriculture, 0.1% in mining, 10.2% in industry, 47.6% in general services (2001).

 87.4% of the population are Catholics, 8.9% are Protestants (1992).

Division
The province comprises two municipalities:
Bermejo Municipality
Padcaya Municipality

Places of interest 
 Tariquía Flora and Fauna National Reserve

External links
General map of province
Detailed map of province towns and rivers
Population data (Spanish)

Provinces of Tarija Department